Southern Railway 777 Sir Lamiel is an N15 “King Arthur” class 4-6-0 steam locomotive built for the Southern Railway by the North British Locomotive Company in June 1925, and withdrawn from service in October 1961. The locomotive is named after a fictional minor Knight of the Round Table named Lamiel of Cardiff. Lamiel is mentioned in Book XIX of Thomas Malory's Le Morte d'Arthur, where it is said he was "a great lover". At first, No. 30453 King Arthur was selected for preservation. However, the lack of a Drummond water cart tender threw those plans out the window. No. 30453 was tragically scrapped as a result of this and No. 30777 was selected for preservation instead.

Sir Lamiel is preserved as part of the National Collection, under the care of the 5305 Locomotive Association, and has been based at the Great Central Railway in Loughborough since 1996.

Until 2017, the locomotive ran regular passenger services on the preserved section of the Great Central Railway, where it is based. It appeared (as a Great Western Railway engine) in the ITV crime drama series Agatha Christie's Poirot. Series 3 episodes: The Plymouth Express and The Double Clue broadcast in 1991. In 1995 it featured in the BBC Television play Cruel Train, an adaptation of the novel La Bête Humaine telling a tale of a murderous engine driver.

Following repair work at Tyseley and Loughborough, in October 2012 emerged in Southern Railway malachite livery as 777 for the first time having previously carried Southern Railway olive green as 777 and in British Railways Brunswick green as 30777 in preservation and at the GCR Autumn gala ran and at some stages double headed with fellow Maunsell and malachite engine SR V Schools class 925 Cheltenham. The locomotive continued to operate until 2017 when it was withdrawn from service, requiring another ten-yearly overhaul. Following several years of storage at Loughborough, plans to return the locomotive to service were announced in July 2020 with it scheduled to return to service in 2023.

References

External links

Arthurian legend
777
NBL locomotives
N15